Hitachi Zosen Inova (HZI) is a Swiss company specialising in energy from waste (EfW).

History
Inova formed, as L. von Roll Bamag AG, in 1933, as a spin-off of the company Gesellschaft der Ludwig von Roll'schen Eisenwerke, which dated from 1823, and specialised in waste treatment. By 1966 the company was operating in France, Germany, Japan and Sweden. In 1975 US operations began. The environmental arm of the company was called Von Roll Inova Group. In 2003 Austrian Energy & Environment Group (AE&E) bought Von Roll Inova on behalf of A-TEC Industries.

Shares in Costain Group dropped when AE&E delayed £22 million in payments due for building the Riverside Resource Recovery ERF in London in November 2010. 

AE&E Inova changed its name to HZI in December 2010 when A-TEC went into administration, and sold it to the Hitachi Zosen Corporation.

In 2014 HZI acquired Axpo Kompogas, allowing it to sell anaerobic waste digestion technology in the UK.

In 2021 HZI acquired from Viessmann Group the german company Schmack Biogas Service, a supplier in the biogas industry, founded in 1995, which was renamed Hitachi Zosen Inova Schmack.

Projects
The company built an EfW plant in San Luis Obispo, California, in 2018, and has pioneered the production of synthetic carbon-neutral methane by electrolysis of water to form hydrogen then reacting it with carbon dioxide, a process it calls EtoGas. 

The Millerhill Recycling and Energy Recovery Centre outside Edinburgh opened in 2019, using combustion and XeroSorp flue gas treatment from HZI. This is a dry adsorption system which uses sodium bicarbonate to clean the exhaust. 

In 2019 the company was contracted to build what will be the largest EFW plant in England, at Rookery South, near Stewartby in Bedfordshire. The project should be completed in 2022, and is the firm's eleventh EfW project in the UK. Local residents mounted a nine-year protest against the plant, which is being built on an abandoned quarry.

The Newhurst EfW plant, in Shepshed in the East Midlands just off the M1, will open in 2023. Ingo Eifert is the project leader for HZI. It will use similar technology to that at Millerhill.

HZI is building Western Australia's first EfW plant near Perth; it is expected to come online in late 2022.

References

External links
 Official site

Engineering companies of Switzerland
Swiss companies established in 2010
Energy companies established in 2010